Major Sir Alexander Bannerman, 11th Baronet (16 December 1871 – 10 March 1934) was a pioneer British military aviator.

Bannerman was born in Brackley in Northamptonshire and educated at Wellington College and subsequently at the Royal Military Academy, Woolwich. He succeeded to the title of 11th Baronet Bannerman, of Elsick in Kincardineshire, on the death of his father the 10th Baronet on 2 December 1901.

Bannerman was commissioned a second lieutenant in the Royal Engineers on 13 August 1891, and promoted to lieutenant on 13 August 1894. He saw active service in the Second Boer War, and was mentioned in Lord Roberts' despatches. Following the end of the war, he was promoted to captain on 22 July 1902.

After the war he returned to the United Kingdom on the SS Orotava which arrived at Southampton in early September 1902, only to depart again in 1903 on a special mission to Japan as British military attache at the Japanese headquarters during the Russo-Japanese War. While there, he observed the use by the Japanese of a tethered balloon at Port Arthur. At the start of 1908, Bannerman was sent to the War Office to work as a general staff officer (third class).

In October 1910, Bannerman left the War Office in order to replace Colonel John Capper as the officer commanding the British Army's School of Ballooning.  In April 1911, when the School of Ballooning was reorganized and the Air Battalion was formed within the Royal Engineers, Bannerman served as its commandant. Just before the Air Battalion became the Royal Flying Corps, Bannerman took flying lessons in order to gain his Royal Aero Club certificate.

He had been a balloonist, so had little knowledge of aeroplanes and he is not reckoned as a successful commander of the Air Battalion.

He retired from Royal Engineers and Royal Flying Corps service on 28 August 1912.

Sir Alexander Bannerman died on 10 March 1934 at the age of 62 in George in the Cape Province, South Africa.

Awards and decorations
 Queen's South Africa Medal
 King's South Africa Medal
 1914–15 Star
 War medal 1915-1918
 Victory Medal
 King George V Coronation Medal
 Mentioned in despatches (Boer War)
 Order of the Rising Sun, 4th class (Japan)
 Order of the Sacred Treasure, 4th class (Japan)
 Russo-Japanese War Medal

References

|-

|-

|-

1871 births
1934 deaths
British military attachés
Military personnel from Northamptonshire
Aviation pioneers
Baronets in the Baronetage of Nova Scotia
British Army personnel of the Second Boer War
Graduates of the Royal Military Academy, Woolwich
People educated at Wellington College, Berkshire
People from Brackley
Recipients of the Order of the Rising Sun, 4th class
Recipients of the Order of the Sacred Treasure, 4th class
Royal Engineers officers
Royal Flying Corps officers
People of the Russo-Japanese War